Ghulam Murshid ( Born 8 April 1940 ) is a Bangladeshi author, scholar and journalist, based in London. He won a number of awards, including  Bangla Academy Literary Award in 1982 for his contribution to research.; Prothom Alo Book Award in 2007;  IFIC literary prize 2018; the  Ekusey Padak for language and literature in 2021 and the Vidyasagar Endowments Lectures 1973 at Calcutta  University. 
Besides being a prolific author, Dr.  Murshid is a distinguished lexicographer. He edited a three-volume  Bengali dictionary, called 'Bibartonmulak Bangla Abhidhan', published in 2013–2014, by the Bangla Academy. In the two hundred years' of history of Bengali dictionaries, it is the first to be based on historical principles. It provides the evolution of the form and meaning of every word and traces the first use thereof in written Bengali.

Selected Research and Publications
Books in English
Reluctant Debutante:  Response of Bengali Women to Modernization, 1849–1905.  ( Rajshahi:  Sahitya Samsad, Rajshahi University, 1983 ).
Lured by Hope: A Biography of Michael Madhusudan Dutt, tr. by Gopa Majumdar, (Delhi: Oxford University Press, 2003).
The Heart of a Rebel Poet: Letters of Michael Madhusudan Dutt, (Delhi: Oxford University Press, 2004).                 
Bengali Culture Over A Thousand Years, tr. by Sarbari Sinha (Delhi: Niyogi Books, 2018)
      
Books in Bengali
Vaishnava Padavali Prabeshak  [ An Introduction to Medieval Vaishnava Songs ]  ( Dhaka:  Khan 	Brothers & Co., 1968).
Vidyasagar [Ishwar Chandra Vidyasagar: 150th Anniversary Commemoration Volume].  Editor and Contributor. (Rajshahi: Sahitya Samsad, Rajshahi University, 1970).  (2nd ed; Calcutta: Vidyodaya Library, 1971; 3rd ed. Dhaka: Shobha Prokash, 2011).
 Bangladesher Swadhinata Sangramer Samskritik Patabhumi  [ The Cultural Background of the War of Liberation in Bangladesh]  ( Calcutta: Indian Associated Press, 1971).
Rabindraviswe Purba-Banga Purba-Bange Rabindracharcha   [ East Bengal in Rabindranath Tagore's Writings and the Study of Tagore in East Bengal ]  ( Based on the Vidyadagar Endowment Lectures given at Calcutta University )  ( 2nd edn; Dhaka: Bangla Academy, 1994. 3rd ed, Abosar, 2016 ).
Samaj Samskar Andolan O Bangla Natak, 1865-76 [Social Reform Movement and Bengali Dramatic Writings ]  ( Dhaka: Bangla Academy, 1985. 2nd ed. Naya Udyog, Kolkata, 2012 ).
 Bangla Mudran O Prakashanar Adi-Parba  [ Early Phase of Printing and Publication in Bengal ]  (Dhaka:  Bangla Academy, 1984).
Samkocher Bivhabalata:  Adhunikatar Abhighate Banga-Ramanir Pratikriya   [ Bengali translation of Response of Bengali Women to Modernization].  ( Dhaka:  Bangla Academy, 1985). (2nd ed.; Calcutta,Naya Udyog 2001. 3rd ed. Prothoma, Dhaka, 2016)
Bengali English Bengali Dictionary  ( London: Ruposhi Bangla, 1989; 2nd ed. 1994).
Kalantare Bangla Gadya  [A history of 18th-century Bengali prose], (Calcutta: Ananda Publishers, 1993. 2nd ed. Abasar, Dhaka, 2016). 	
Jakhan Palatak  [Based on the author's experiences during the War of Liberation in Bangladesh] (Dhaka: Sahitya Prakash, 1993, 2nd ed. 2004).
Rasasundari theke Rokeya: Nariprogatir Eksho Bachhar [From Rasasundari to Rokeya: A Century of Women's Modernization] (Dhaka: Bangla Academy, 1994. 2nd ed. 1999. 3rd ed. 2016)              
Ashar Chhalaner Bhuli [Seduced by Hope: A literary biography of Michael Madhusudan Dutt] (Calcutta: Ananda Publishers, 1995. 2nd ed. 1997. 3rd ed. 2000, Reprinted many times since then.)
Ujan Srote Bangladesh, (Dhaka: Mowla Brothers, 2003).
Hazar Bachhorer Bangali Samskriti, (Dhaka: Abosar, 2006. Reprinted 10 times).
 Nari Dharmo Ityadi, (Dhaka: Anya Prokash, 2007).
 Madhur Khonje, (Dhaka: Abosar, 2007).
Kalapanir Hatchhani: Bilete Bangalir Itihas, (Dhaka: Abosar, 2008.)
Atharo Shataker Bangla Gadya: Itiahs O Sankalan, (Dhaka: Anya Prokash, 2009. 2nd ed, Kolkata: Naya Udyog, 2010.)
Chhoto-barho Sobar Michael, A short biography of Michael Madhusudan, (Dhaka: Abosar, 2009.)
 Muktijuddha O tarpor: Ekti Nirdaliya Itihas, (Dhaka: Prothoma, 2010. Reprinted 14 times).
 Bangla Academy Bibartanmulak Abhidhan, 3 Vols, Editor, (Dhaka: Bangla Academy 2013–14).
 Renaissance Banglar Renaissance, (Dhaka: Abosar, 2015).
Alokita Mukhocchabi, (Dhaka: Abosar, 2017).
Bidrohi Ranaklanta: Nazrul Jibani, (Dhaka: Prothoma, 2018, 5th ed Jan 2020).
 Rabindranather Nari-bhabna (Dhaka: Abasor, January, 2020)

References

Living people
Place of birth missing (living people)
University of Dhaka alumni
Academics of SOAS University of London
Bangladeshi journalists
Bangladeshi scholars
Bangladeshi non-fiction writers
Recipients of Bangla Academy Award
Bangladeshi expatriates in the United Kingdom
Recipients of the Ekushey Padak
1940 births